Vaulx-Milieu is a commune in the Isère department in southeastern France.

Geography
The Bourbre flows northwest through the middle of the commune.

Population

See also
Communes of the Isère department

References

Communes of Isère
Isère communes articles needing translation from French Wikipedia